Hank, also known as Hank T. Dog, is an unofficial mascot of the Milwaukee Brewers of Major League Baseball. Believed to be a part-Bichon Frise mixed-breed of about two or three years of age, Hank was rescued by the Brewers when he wandered into their spring training facility before the start of the 2014 MLB season.

Background
Hank was a stray dog when he wandered around the fields of the spring training facility of the Milwaukee Brewers, located at Maryvale Baseball Park in Phoenix, Arizona, on February 17, 2014. Hank was first spotted by security guards, and was then taken inside the facility by Brewers coach Ed Sedar.

Team officials attempted to find an owner, and when one could not be found, they rescued Hank. They took him to a veterinarian, where he was treated for a laceration. The organization named him Hank in honor of Hank Aaron. Hank competed in a Sausage Race during a spring training game wearing a hot dog costume on February 26.

Reactions
Hank's story went viral on social media, and was covered by many news outlets. The Brewers received over 1,000 requests to adopt Hank. Towards the end of spring training, the Brewers announced that Hank would remain with the team. He was included on a charter flight to Milwaukee in March; its arrival at Mitchell International Airport was attended by Chris Abele, the County Executive for Milwaukee County, and Tom Barrett, the Mayor of Milwaukee. Fans met Hank at Miller Park in Milwaukee. The team unveiled official Hank-themed merchandise. Over a thousand shirts, bearing the name "Hank" and the number "K9", were sold on the first day. The Brewers donated 20% of the proceeds to the Wisconsin Humane Society at the end of the 2014 MLB season.

Hank was adopted by Marti Wronski, who works as the team's vice president and general counsel, and her family, who live in Whitefish Bay, Wisconsin. Hank was believed to be between two and three years old and a bichon frise mixed-breed. The Brewers intend to have him attend many, but not all, home games.

Bernie Brewer, the Brewers' official mascot, led Hank onto the field during introductions on Opening Day. The next day, Hank had neutering surgery. Hank had a Bobblehead giveaway on September 13, 2014. Hank met baseball legend Hank Aaron on August 21, 2014. In January 2015, Hank won the Golden Hydrant award when he was named Dog of the Year at the inaugural World Dog Awards. On May 10, 2015, Hank had another bobblehead giveaway in his honor.

See also

List of individual dogs

References

Individual dogs
Milwaukee Brewers
Major League Baseball team mascots